Petropavlovka is a rural locality (a village) in Cheremshansky Selsovet of Kuraginsky District, Krasnoyarsk Krai, Russia. The population was 790 as of 2010. Petropavlovka is known as the place where the Church of the Last Testament is based.

References 

Rural localities in Krasnoyarsk Krai
Kuraginsky District